Mr What's His Name is a 1935 British film. It stars Seymour Hicks and was based on his play.

It was shot at Warner Bros' Teddington Studios.

Plot
A beautician meets and falls in love with a young man, and they soon marry. What she doesn't know, however, is that her new husband is actually a millionaire who is suffering from amnesia—and he already has a wife.

Cast
 Seymour Hicks as Alfred Henfield
 Olive Blakeney as Ann Henfield
 Enid Stamp-Taylor as Corinne Henfield
 Garry Marsh as Yates
 Toni Edgar-Bruce as Sylvia
 Martita Hunt as Mrs. Davies
 Henry B. Longhurst as Mr. Bullen

References

External links

Mr What's His Name at TCMDB

British black-and-white films
1930s English-language films
1935 films
British comedy films
1935 comedy films
Films directed by Ralph Ince
1930s British films